Circle Records is a jazz record label founded in 1946 by Rudi Blesh and Harriet Janis.

History
In New York, Blesh and Janis heard jazz drummer Warren "Baby" Dodds playing inventive solos with Bunk Johnson's band. Blesh said he hated drum solos until he saw Dodds. To record Dodds and others, they started Circle Records. The name was given by fellow audience member Marcel Duchamp.

Circle recorded traditional jazz of the time, and its releases included Chippie Hill, George Lewis, and broadcasts of Blesh's This is Jazz radio show. The label was the first to release Jelly Roll Morton's Library of Congress recordings. Blesh and Janis continued the label until 1952. Circle Records also released modern classical music by artists including Henry Cowell and Paul Hindemith.

Circle was bought in the mid-1960s by George H. Buck, Jr. The Circle catalog is now under the control of the George H. Buck Jr. Jazz Foundation. Some of the original Circle recordings have been reissued on compact disc through other labels controlled by the George H. Buck Jr. Jazz Foundation, including American Music, Southland, and Jazzology.

This Circle Records is not to be confused with the German record label of the same name.

Selected label discography: 1946–1952
The first record issued by Circle Records was by the Baby Dodds Trio. Many of their subsequent releases were albums of from two to four 10", 78 RPM shellac records, issued in a binder. Many of the albums included cover art by Jimmy Ernst or Charles Alston.

Circle Records today
Circle Records was reactivated and is used by the George H. Buck Jr. Jazz Foundation to release swing music. The reactivated Circle label put out recordings from the Lang-Worth and World transcriptions.

Notes

References

See also
 List of record labels

External links
Circle Records on the Internet Archive's Great 78 Project
Numerical Listing of Circle 78rpm issues (1946 - 1952) on The Online Discographical Project

Jazz record labels
American record labels
Record labels established in 1946
1946 establishments in the United States